Pleshkova is a rural locality (a village) in Oshibskoye Rural Settlement, Kudymkarsky District, Perm Krai, Russia. The population was 44 as of 2010. There are 3 streets.

Geography 
Pleshkova is located 28 km northeast of Kudymkar (the district's administrative centre) by road. Kuzmina is the nearest rural locality.

References 

Rural localities in Kudymkarsky District